Douglas J. Lecuyer (born March 10, 1958) is a Canadian retired professional ice hockey forward who played 126 games in the National Hockey League for the Chicago Black Hawks, Winnipeg Jets, and Pittsburgh Penguins.

Lecuyer was born in Wainwright, Alberta. He played junior in the Western Hockey League from 1973 until 1978. He became a professional the following season with the Chicago Blackhawks organization.

Having been a talented junior golfer, after retiring from hockey Lecuyer returned to the sport and pursued a career as a professional golfer.

Career statistics

Regular season and playoffs

Professional golf tournament wins
1983 Canadian Assistant Professionals Championship
1984 PGA of Alberta Championship
1985 PGA of Alberta Championship
1986 PGA of Alberta Championship

References

External links
 

1958 births
Living people
Canadian ice hockey forwards
Chicago Blackhawks draft picks
Chicago Blackhawks players
Edmonton Oil Kings (WCHL) players
Ice hockey people from Alberta
Pittsburgh Penguins players
Winnipeg Jets (1979–1996) players
Canadian male golfers
Golfing people from Alberta